The SPARK Museum of Electrical Invention (formerly the American Museum of Radio and Electricity) is an interactive museum located in Bellingham, Washington, United States, which offers educational experiences for audiences of all ages through galleries and public programs that illustrate the development and use of electricity, radio and the related inventions that changed the course of human history. The museum features a collection of artifacts showcasing four centuries of human innovation from 1580 into the 1950s.

Museum history
The museum began in 1985 as an informal collection of radio sets, spare parts, schematics, recordings, and vintage magazines and manuals owned by a Bellingham resident, Jonathan Winter Winter's collection continued to grow, and by 1998, the Bellingham Antique Radio Museum was officially established, with the more than 800 radio sets from Winter's collection forming the core of the museum's collection.

The museum took on the name "American Museum of Radio and Electricity" in 2001 when it moved into its  facility and John Jenkins, a former sales and marketing executive at Microsoft, retired and became co-curator of the museum. Jenkins added his extensive collection to the museum, which included early wireless and electrical devices, and rare books with first editions dating back to 1560 and written by 
Robert Boyle, 
Michael Faraday, 
C. F. du Fay, 
Benjamin Franklin, 
Luigi Galvani, 
William Gilbert, 
Joseph Henry, 
Heinrich Hertz, 
James Clerk Maxwell, 
Pieter van Musschenbroek, 
Georg Ohm, 
Hans Christian Ørsted, 
Alessandro Volta, 
among others.

Early in its history, the museum was featured on An American Moment.
In 2012, the American Museum of Radio and Electricity became Spark Museum of Electrical Invention.

Collections
The museum's collections include:

 Dawn of the Electrical Age (1600–1800)
 Electricity Sparks Invention (1800–1900)
 The Beginning of Radio and the Wireless Era (1863–1920)
 Radio Enters the Home (1920–1927)
 The Golden Age of Radio (1928–1950)

Notable exhibits
Exhibits include:

 an extensive "War of the Currents" exhibit, featuring one of a kind artifacts. The exhibit also includes a working replica of Tesla's "Egg of Columbus".
 a reproduction of the radio room of the Titanic complete with original Marconi wireless apparatus
 a working 1929 theremin and a modern Moog Theremin that visitors can play (RCA Theremin Model AR 1264, No. 200085
 a complete collection of Atwater Kent "breadboard" radios
 one of the largest collections of 19th century electromagnetic apparatus in the country, including early telegraph, telephone, electric motors, dynamos and induction coils
 a collection of electric lighting and related apparatus, including several lamps from the laboratory of Thomas Edison.
 Demonstration Tesla coils including the "MegaZapper, an 8' tall 4MV coil used in the Museum's Electrical Show.
 a Collins 1909 wireless telephone
 a 1930s living room diorama
 a static electricity learning center
 a working RCA CT-100 Television
 a 1915 telephone used by Henry L. Higginson in the first transcontinental telephone call.

Science education program
The museum's education program includes outreach and community education.  The outreach program augments the regular science curriculum of public schools, private schools and home-school networks in Western Washington through assemblies, in-class science courses and special focus tours. The community education program holds regular Science Saturday classes, summer camps, lectures and special events illuminating core facets of radio, electricity and physics. Hands-on classes include topics such as static electricity, magnetism, motors, circuits, and crystal radios.

In 2018, the SPARK education program served nearly 2,000 students.

Events

Aside from normal operations, the museum utilizes its Tesla Performance Center to host various events.

Past events include:

 The Chuckanut Radio Hour
 Midnight Mystery Players
 Art Of Jazz Series
 Sustainable Connections
 LinuxFest Northwest
 Bellingham Robot Festival
An Evening with Benjamin Franklin
Lectures, including "The roots of radio", "The untold story of the telephone", "The untold story of the telegraph", and "The war of the currents" by Museum President John Jenkins

See also
20th Century Technology Museum
Museum of Radio and Technology
Museum of Broadcast Communications
National Radio Hall of Fame

References

Further reading
Loud Talker: The Early History of Loudspeakers by John D. Jenkins (Interested in purchasing this book, click here.)
Where Discovery Sparks Imagination by John D. Jenkins (Interested in purchasing this book, click here.)
The Untold Story of the Telegraph by John D. Jenkins (Interested in purchasing this book, click here.)

External links
SPARK Museum of Electrical Invention website

1998 establishments in Washington (state)
Museums established in 1998
Technology museums in the United States
Science museums in Washington (state)
Industry museums in Washington (state)
Museums in Bellingham, Washington
Telecommunications museums in the United States